George Lowys (by 1500 – 1553/54) was the Mayor of Winchelsea and Member of Parliament for Winchelsea, Sussex.

He was made mayor of Winchelsea for 1525–27, 1531–1534, 1536, 1537–38, 1551–52 and then elected Member of Parliament for Winchelsea in 1529 and possibly again in 1536.

He married Dorothy and had two sons.

References

Year of death missing
Mayors of Winchelsea
English MPs 1529–1536
Year of birth uncertain